The 1921 Thuringia state election was held on 11 September 1921 to elect the 54 members of the Landtag of Thuringia.

Results

References 

Thuringia
Elections in Thuringia